Marion Bartoli and Anna-Lena Grönefeld won the doubles title in this edition of the Thailand Open. The 2004 edition was cancelled.

Seeds

  Magüi Serna /  Tamarine Tanasugarn (quarterfinals)
  Marion Bartoli /  Anna-Lena Grönefeld (winners)
  Jennifer Hopkins /  Mashona Washington (semifinals)
  Tatiana Poutchek /  Anastasia Rodionova (quarterfinals)

Draw

References
 Main and Qualifying Draws
 2005 Tokyo Indoor and Pattaya WTA Singles Results     Maria Sharapova & Conchita Martinez, Champions

Doubles
Volvo Women's Open - Doubles
 in women's tennis